Events in the year 2017 in Paraguay.

Incumbents
 President: Horacio Cartes

Events

1 April – 2017 Paraguay protests: President Horacio Cartes's attempts to reform the Constitution to allow for re-election are met with mass protests with protestors storming the Congress and one death.
24 April – In the early hours of the day a suspected Brazilian gang of robbers stole 11.7 million dollars from a security vault in Ciudad del Este, leaving one police officer dead. It is the biggest heist in Paraguay's history.
24 June – After 2–0 over Independiente de Campo Grande, Club Libertad wins the 2017 Paraguayan Apertura championship.

Deaths

9 January – Roberto Cabañas, footballer (b. 1961).
24 January – Porfirio Méndez, middle-distance runner (b. 1966).
25 July – Luis María Ramírez Boettner, lawyer and diplomat, Minister of Foreign Affairs (b. 1918).
2 October – Patrocinio Samudio, footballer (b. 1975).
24 November – Ángel Berni, footballer (b. 1931).
20 December – Rosa Brítez, potter (b. 1941).

References

 
2010s in Paraguay
Years of the 21st century in Paraguay
Paraguay
Paraguay